"The Search Is Over" is a 1985 power ballad by the American rock band Survivor. It was the band's third single and second top-ten hit from their 1984 album Vital Signs.

Background
Former keyboardist/guitarist for the band and co-songwriter Jim Peterik told Songfacts: "It wasn't about my life as much as a friend of mine who had a girlfriend – really a play pal throughout their growing up years – and never thought it could be anything more than that. It was looking him straight in the face that this was the girl of his destiny, and he looked everywhere to find that dream girl only to come back to the sandbox."

Charts 
It peaked at No. 4 on the Billboard Hot 100 the week of July 13, 1985, and finished at No. 48 on the year-end Billboard Hot 100 chart for 1985. The song also spent four weeks atop the adult contemporary chart, Survivor's only chart-topper on this tally.

Year-end charts

See also
List of Hot Adult Contemporary number ones of 1985

References

1984 songs
1985 singles
Survivor (band) songs
Songs written by Frankie Sullivan
Songs written by Jim Peterik
Song recordings produced by Ron Nevison
Scotti Brothers Records singles
Rock ballads